Holodiscus discolor, commonly known as ocean spray or oceanspray, creambush, or ironwood, is a shrub of western North America.

Description 
The young branches have longitudinal ridges.

Cascading clusters of white flowers drooping from the branches give the plant its two common names. The flowers have a faint sweet, sugary scent. The bloom period is May to July.

It bears a small, hairy fruit containing one seed which is light enough to be dispersed by wind.

Distribution and habitat 
The plant is common in the Pacific Northwest, and throughout California in diverse habitats including California mixed evergreen forest, California oak woodlands, chaparral, Coast redwood forest, Douglas-fir forest, Yellow pine forest, Red fir forest, and Lodgepole pine forest. It is native to regions of California including the High Sierra Nevada, Northern and Southern California Coast Ranges, Klamath Mountains, Santa Cruz Mountains, Western Transverse Ranges, and the San Gabriel Mountains.

It is found in a variety of habitats, from moist coastal forests to drier, cooler mountains of inland California. The plant is found in areas prone to wildfire, and it is often the first green shoot to spring up in an area recovering from a burn. It is commonly found in chaparral communities, a fire ecology ecosystem which evolved with burning periodically. It also may grow in areas cleared by logging.

In the California black oak woodland plant community, common understory associate species include Toxicodendron diversilobum (Western poison-oak), Heteromeles arbutifolia (toyon), and Dryopteris arguta (coastal wood fern).

Ecology
It is of special value as a pollinator plant for native bees and butterflies.  It is also a larval host to Lorquin's admiral, pale tiger swallowtail, and spring azure caterpillars.

Uses
Historically, the plant has been used by Indigenous peoples for many purposes. Raw and cooked seeds were eaten, and leaves were mixed with those of other plants and boiled with small game animals. Many tribes used the wood and bark for making tools and furniture. Noted for the strength of its wood, it was often used for making digging sticks, spears, arrows, bows, harpoons and nails. The wood, like with many other plants, was often hardened with fire and was then polished using horsetail.

Comox natives use oceanspray when flowering as an indicator of the best time to dig for butter clams.

Medicinal
The Lummi used the flowers as an antidiarrheal and the leaves as a poultice. Several Native American tribes, such as the Stl'atl'imx, would steep the berries in boiling water to use as a treatment for diarrhea, smallpox, chickenpox and as a blood tonic.

References

External links

Calflora Database: Holodiscus discolor (Cream bush, Oceanspray)
 Jepson Manual eFlora (TJM2) treatment of Holodiscus discolor
USDA Plants Profile for  Holodiscus discolor (oceanspray)
UC Photos gallery of Holodiscus discolor (oceanspray)

discolor
Flora of British Columbia
Flora of California
Flora of Idaho
Flora of Oregon
Flora of Washington (state)
Flora of the Cascade Range
Flora of the Klamath Mountains
Flora of the Sierra Nevada (United States)
Natural history of the California chaparral and woodlands
Natural history of the California Coast Ranges
Natural history of the San Francisco Bay Area
Natural history of the Transverse Ranges
Taxa named by Frederick Traugott Pursh
Plants used in traditional Native American medicine
Garden plants of North America
Butterfly food plants